Jan Rijspoort was a Flemish composer who was active at the end of Renaissance and beginning of the early Baroque period. He worked in the Spanish Netherlands at the end of the 16th century and the beginning of the 17th century. Very little is known about his life.

The songs collected in the Morale Spreeckwoorden 
This collection was published in 1617 by the Antwerp publisher Phalesius. A complete copy of this work, containing polyphonic Dutch songs, has yet to be discovered.

References

External links 
  Belgian composers
  Composers’ Biographies on Dolmetsch.com

Renaissance composers
Flemish Baroque composers
Year of birth unknown
Year of death unknown
Musicians of the Spanish Netherlands
Male classical composers